Arthur "Mick" Edward Mather (3 May 1918 – 4 August 2005) was an Australian rugby league footballer who played in the 1930s and 1940s.

Background 
Mather graduated into South Sydney's playing ranks from Marist Brothers High School, Darlinghurst. Following school, he became a fitter and turner and achieved a Higher Trade Certificate in Marine Engineering and Applied Mechanics at Sydney Technical College in 1937. Mather joined the Royal Australian Air Force in 1940 and flew bombers over Europe and the Middle East during World War II. Mather was awarded the Distinguished Flying Cross in the Siege of Tobruk. He stayed in the Air Force after the war, receiving the Air Force Cross in 1965 before retiring as a wing commander in 1973.

Playing career 
Mather made his debut with South Sydney in round 10 against Newtown in 1939. Souths won that game 13–8. That ended up being the only game he played that season. Souths finished with 9 wins out of 14 games to sneak into the finals. They defeated the home side St. George in the semi finals 10–23, however, they lost 33–4 to Balmain in the grand final.

Mather scored his first and only career try in round 6 in a 24–13 loss to the Newtown club. He made six more appearances that season without scoring another try.

Mather ended his career in the game early – as well as his career as a water-polo player and lifesaver at Maroubra Surf Life-Saving Club – to pursue a career in the Air Force.

Personal life 
Mather retired from the Air Force in 1973. He died in 2005 at age 87 at Parramatta, although some sources say he died in Newcastle.

References 

1918 births
2005 deaths
Australian rugby league players
South Sydney Rabbitohs players
Rugby league props
Royal Australian Air Force personnel of World War II
Royal Australian Air Force officers
Australian World War II pilots
Recipients of the Distinguished Flying Cross (United Kingdom)
Recipients of the Air Force Cross (United Kingdom)